Sharrieffa Barksdale (born February 16, 1961) is an American hurdler. She was born in Harriman, Tennessee. She competed at the 1984 Summer Olympics in Los Angeles, where she reached the semi-finals in women's 400 m hurdles. Barksdale owns one on one training academy. Barksdale was an American record holder in 400 m hurdles. Sharrieffa Barksdale is a member of Sigma Gamma Rho.

She also represented her country at the 1983 World Championships in Athletics and was a silver medalist at the 1983 Pan American Games. She was the national champion at the USA Outdoor Track and Field Championships that same year. She was an All-American athlete at the University of Tennessee.

References

External links 

 
 
Barksdale supports Lady Vols name

1961 births
Living people
Track and field athletes from Tennessee
People from Harriman, Tennessee
American female hurdlers
African-American female track and field athletes
Olympic track and field athletes of the United States
Athletes (track and field) at the 1984 Summer Olympics
Pan American Games track and field athletes for the United States
Pan American Games medalists in athletics (track and field)
Athletes (track and field) at the 1983 Pan American Games
World Athletics Championships athletes for the United States
Pan American Games silver medalists for the United States
Medalists at the 1983 Pan American Games
21st-century African-American people
21st-century African-American women
20th-century African-American sportspeople
20th-century African-American women
20th-century African-American people